Hooponopono is a traditional Hawaiian practice of reconciliation and forgiveness. The Hawaiian word translates into English simply as correction, with the synonyms manage or supervise.  Similar forgiveness practices are performed on islands throughout the South Pacific, including Hawaii, Samoa, Tahiti and New Zealand. Traditional Hooponopono is practiced by Indigenous Hawaiian healers, often within the extended family by a family member.

Polynesian antecedents

In many Polynesian cultures, it is believed that a person's errors (called hara or hala) caused illness. Some believe error angers the gods, others that it attracts malevolent gods, and still others believe the guilt caused by error made one sick.  "In most cases, however, specific 'untie-error' rites could be performed to atone for such errors and thereby diminish one's accumulation of them."

Among the islands of Vanuatu in the South Pacific, people believe that illness usually is caused by sexual misconduct or anger. "If you are angry for two or three days, sickness will come," said one local man. The therapy that counters this sickness is confession. The patient, or a family member, may confess. If no one confesses an error, the patient may die. The Vanuatu people believe that secrecy is what gives power to the illness. When the error is confessed, it no longer has power over the person.

Like many other islanders, including Hawaiians, people of Tikopia in the Solomon Islands, and on Rarotonga in the Cook Islands, believe that the sins of the father will fall upon the children. If a child is sick, the parents are suspected of quarreling or misconduct. In addition to sickness, social disorder could cause sterility of land or other disasters. Harmony could be restored only by confession and apology.

In Pukapuka, it was customary to hold sort of a confessional over patients to determine an appropriate course of action in order to heal them.

Similar traditions are found in Samoa, Tahiti, and among the Maori of New Zealand.

Etymology

"Hooponopono" is defined in the Hawaiian Dictionary as:

(a) "To put to rights; to put in order or shape, correct, revise, adjust, amend, regulate, arrange, rectify, tidy up make orderly or neat, administer, superintend, supervise, manage, edit, work carefully or neatly; to make ready, as canoemen preparing to catch a wave."

(b) "Mental cleansing: family conferences in which relationships were set right (hooponopono) through prayer, discussion, confession, repentance, and mutual restitution and forgiveness."

Literally, hoo is a particle used to make an actualizing verb from the following noun. Here, it creates a verb from the noun pono, which is defined as: "...goodness, uprightness, morality, moral qualities, correct or proper procedure, excellence, well-being, prosperity, welfare, benefit, true condition or nature, duty; moral, fitting, proper, righteous, right, upright, just, virtuous, fair, beneficial, successful, in perfect order, accurate, correct, eased, relieved; should, ought, must, necessary."

Ponopono is defined as "to put to rights; to put in order or shape, correct, revise, adjust, amend, regulate, arrange, rectify, tidy up, make orderly or neat."

So hooponopono can be translated literally as "to make right" or "to make good".

Traditional practice
Hawaiian scholar Nana Veary in her book, Change We Must: My Spiritual Journey wrote that ho'oponopono was a practice in Ancient Hawaii and this is supported by oral histories from contemporary Hawaiian elders. Pukui first recorded her experiences and observations from her childhood (born 1895) in her 1958 book.

Although the word hooponopono was not used, early Hawaiian historians documented a belief that illness was caused by breaking kapu, or spiritual laws, and that the illness could not be cured until the sufferer atoned for this transgression, often with the assistance of a praying priest (kahuna pule) or healing priest (kahuna lapaau). Forgiveness was sought from the gods or from the person with whom there was a dispute.

Pukui described it as a practice of extended family members meeting to "make right" broken family relations. Some families met daily or weekly, to prevent problems from erupting. Others met when a person became ill, believing that illness was caused by the stress of anger, guilt, recriminations and lack of forgiveness. Kupuna Nana Veary wrote that when any of the children in her family fell ill, her grandmother would ask the parents, "What have you done?" They believed that healing could come only with complete forgiveness of the whole family.

Ritual
Hooponopono corrects, restores and maintains good relationships among family members and with their god(s) by getting to the causes and sources of trouble. Usually the most senior member of the family conducts it. He or she gathers the family together. If the family is unable to work through a problem, they turn to a respected outsider.

The process begins with prayer. A statement of the problem is made, and the transgression discussed. Family members are expected to work problems through and cooperate, not "hold fast to the fault". One or more periods of silence may be taken for reflection on the entanglement of emotions and injuries. Everyone's feelings are acknowledged. Then confession, repentance and forgiveness take place. Everyone releases (kala) each other, letting go. They cut off the past (oki), and together they close the event with a ceremonial feast, called pani, which often included eating limu kala or kala seaweed, symbolic of the release.

In a form used by the family of kahuna Makaweliweli of the island of Molokai, the completion of hooponopono is represented by giving the person forgiven a lei made from the fruit of the hala tree.

Modern uses
"Aunty" Malia Craver, who worked with the Queen Liliuokalani Children's Centers (QLCC) for more than 30 years, taught courses in traditional hooponopono. On August 30, 2000, she spoke about it to the United Nations.

Traditional applications
In the late 20th century, courts in Hawaii began to order juvenile and adult offenders to work with an elder who would conduct hooponopono for their families, as a form of alternative dispute resolution. The hooponopono is conducted in the traditional way, without court interference, with a practitioner picked by the family from a list of court-approved providers.

Some native practitioners provide hooponopono to clients who otherwise might seek family counseling.

Freedom from karma

In 1976 Morrnah Simeona, regarded as a healing priest or kahuna lapaau, adapted the traditional hooponopono of family mutual forgiveness to the social realities of the modern day. For this she extended it both to a general problem solving process outside the family and to a psycho-spiritual self-help rather than group process.

Simeona's version is influenced by her Christian (Protestant and Catholic) education and her philosophical studies about India, China and Edgar Cayce. Like Hawaiian tradition she emphasizes prayer, confession, repentance, and mutual restitution and forgiveness. Unlike Hawaiian tradition, she describes problems only as the effects of negative karma, saying that "you have to experience by yourself what you have done to others." But that you are the creator of your life circumstances was common knowledge for the people of old as "things we had brought with us from other lifetimes." Any wrongdoing is memorized within oneself and mirrored in every entity and object which was present when the cause happened. As the Law of Cause and Effect predominates in all of life and lifetimes, the purpose of her version is mainly "to release unhappy, negative experiences in past reincarnations, and to resolve and remove traumas from the 'memory banks'." Karmic bondages hinder the evolution of mind, so that "(karmic) cleansing is a requisite for the expansion of awareness". Using her 14-step-process would dissolve those bondages. She did not use mantras or conditioning exercises.

Her teachings include: there is a Divine Creator who takes care of altruistic pleas of Men; "when the phrase 'And it is done' is used after a prayer, it means Man's work ends and God's begins." "Self-Identity" signifies, e.g. during the hooponopono, that the three selves or aspects of consciousness are balanced and connected with the Divine Creator. Different from egoistic prayers, "altruistic prayers like hooponopono, where you also pray for the release of other entities and objects, reach the Divine plane or Cosmos because of their high vibrations. From that plane the Divine energy or "mana" would come," which would transform the painful part of the memory of the wrong actions in all participants to "Pure Light", on whatever plane they are existing; "all are set free". Through this transmutation in the mind the problems will lose their energy for physical effects, and healing or balancing is begun. In this sense, Simeona's mana is not the same as the traditional Polynesian understanding of mana.

Pacifica Seminars, founded by Morrnah Simeona, started the first Ho'oponopono seminars in Germany. Seminars are still held on a regular basis in Germany, Poland, France, and Denmark.

State of Zero
After Simeona's death in 1992, her former student and administrator, Ihaleakala Hew Len, co-authored a book with Joe Vitale called Zero Limits referring to Simeona's Hooponopono teachings. Len makes no claim to be a kahuna. In contrast to Simeona's teachings, the book brings the new idea that the main objective of Hooponopono is getting to the "zero state — it's where we have zero limits. No memories. No identity. " To reach this state, which Len called 'Self-I-Dentity thru Ho'oponopono', includes using the mantra, "I love you. I'm sorry. Please forgive me.  Thank you." It is based on Len's idea of 100% responsibility, taking responsibility for everyone's actions, not only for one's own. If one would take complete responsibility for one's life, then everything one sees, hears, tastes, touches, or in any way experiences would be one's responsibility because it is in one's life. The problem would not be with our external reality, it would be with ourselves. Total Responsibility, according to Hew Len, advocates that everything exists as a projection from inside the human being.

Footnotes

See also
 Restorative Justice
 Ifoga
Hoʻoponopono Mantra

References
 Buck, Peter Te Rangi Hiroa, The Coming of the Maori, Wellington, Whitcombe and Tombs (1950)
 Chai, Makana Risser, Na Moolelo Lomilomi: The Traditions of Hawaiian Massage & Healing, Bishop Museum Press (2005) 
 Handy, E.S.Craighill Polynesian Religion, Kraus Reprint & Periodicals (1971)
 Kamakau, Samuel, Ka Poe Kahiko (The People of Old), Bishop Museum Press (1992)
 Lee, Pali Jae, Ho'opono, I M Publishing (2008)
 Lee, Pali Jae, Koko Willis, Tales from the Night Rainbow, Night Rainbow Publishing Co. (1990) 
 Malo, Davida, (Chun, trans) Ka Moolelo Hawaii: Hawaiian Traditions, First Peoples Productions
 Oliver, Douglas, Polynesia in Early Historic Times, Bess Press (2002) 
 Parsons, Claire F., Healing Practices in the South Pacific, Institute for Polynesian Studies (1995) 
 Pukui, Mary Kawena and Elbert, Samuel H., University of Hawaii (1986) 
 Pukui, Mary Kawena, Haertig, E.W. and Lee, Catherine, Nana i ke Kumu: Look to the Source, Vol 1, Hui Hanai (1983) 
 Pukui, Mary Kawena, E.S. Craighill Handy, The Polynesian Family System in Kau, Hawaii, 1958, Mutual Pub Co, (Hawaii 2006) 
 Shook, Victoria E. Hooponopono: Contemporary Uses of a Hawaiian Problem Solving Process, University of Hawaii Press (1986) 
 Simeona, Morrnah, Self-Identity through Hooponopono, Basic 1, Pacifica Seminars (1990)
 Steuterman, Kim Rogers, "Sacred Harmony", Hawaii Magazine (Jan/Feb 2004)
 Titcomb (1948) "Kava in Hawaii", Journal of the Polynesian Society, 57:105–71, 144
 Vitale, Joe, Hew Len Ph.D., Zero Limits, Wiley (2007)

Hawaiiana
Conflict (process)
Dispute resolution
Family therapy
Hawaiian words and phrases
Oceanian culture
Spirituality
Austronesian spirituality